Hermitage Peak is a peak,  high, standing  north of Mount Ubique, in the Surveyors Range, Antarctica. It was named by the New Zealand Geological Survey Antarctic Expedition (1960–61) for Hermitage, Berkshire, England, the home of the Royal School of Military Survey.

References

Mountains of the Ross Dependency
Amundsen Coast